"Rise Above This" is a song by South African rock band Seether. It is the second single from the band's album Finding Beauty in Negative Spaces. It is the sixth track on the album and became the band's second consecutive number-one song on the U.S. Modern Rock chart.

Background
Seether's vocalist Shaun Morgan has stated that the song is about his late brother, Eugene Welgemoed, and was written before his suicide. "Rise Above This" was written to bring Eugene out of a depression. There was also an acoustic version of this song for those who pre-ordered 2011 tour tickets. This version sounds almost the same as the iTunes Originals version, but the iTunes version has an electric guitar in the background and this version is pure acoustic, its length is 3:35. It originally appeared on Rhapsody Originals.

Music video
The music video, directed by Tony Petrossian who also directed the "Fake It" video, debuted on MTV2 and MTV2's website on April 5, 2008. During filming, the band had to try performing three times due to Morgan's difficulty from keeping himself from crying. The video's storyline revolves around a depressed boy who decides to commit suicide by jumping off a building. As he falls, his family, including Morgan, falls with him. Then, during the bridge and the rest of the song, everyone in the family bounces back up. It has a Suicide Hotline number at the end of the video on television airings in America as well as a picture of Shaun Morgan's younger brother. Shaun's brother, Eugene, actually jumped from an 8th floor window of the hotel that the band was currently staying at while on tour. Eugene was pronounced dead at the scene.

Charts

References

2007 songs
2008 singles
Seether songs
Wind-up Records singles
Music videos directed by Tony Petrossian
Song recordings produced by Howard Benson
Songs written by John Humphrey (drummer)
Songs written by Shaun Morgan
Songs written by Dale Stewart
Songs about depression